Magnetic Hill may refer to;
A magnetic hill, also called a gravity hill, a type of optical illusion created by the surrounding landscape
List of magnetic hills, specific geographical gravity hill locations:
Magnetic Hill (Canada), a tourist attraction, featuring a gravity hill, a theme park, a miniature railroad, and Magnetic Hill Golf Course
Magnetic Hill (India)

 Magnetic Hill Concert Site, one of the largest live music venues in Canada
 Magnetic Hill School, a school in Lutes Mountain, New Brunswick
 Magnetic Hill Zoo, the largest zoo in Atlantic Canada

 "Magnetic Hill", a song by Canadian rock band Land of Talk